The men's 3000 metres at the 2021 World Athletics U20 Championships was held at the Kasarani Stadium on 18 August.

Records

Results
The final was held on 18 August at 17:50.

References

3000 metres men
Long distance running at the World Athletics U20 Championships